Collagen alpha-3(IX) chain is a protein that in humans is encoded by the COL9A3 gene.

Function 

This gene encodes one of the three alpha chains of type IX collagen, the major collagen component of hyaline cartilage. Type IX collagen, a heterotrimeric molecule, is usually found in tissues containing type II collagen, a fibrillar collagen. Mutations in this gene are associated with multiple epiphyseal dysplasia.

References

External links
  GeneReviews/NCBI/NIH/UW entry on Multiple Epiphyseal Dysplasia, Dominant

Further reading

Collagens